George Percy Jacomb-Hood  (6 July 1857 – 11 December 1929) was a painter, etcher and illustrator. He was a founding member of the New English Art Club and Society of Portrait Painters.

Early life

Jacomb-Hood was born on 6 July 1857 at Redhill in Surrey, the fourth of nine children (two of whom died in infancy) of Robert Jacomb-Hood (1822–1900) and Jane Stothard Littlewood (1827–1869). His grandfather, a yeoman farmer in Essex was born Robert Jacomb (1794–1857), but was a cousin of William Hood, the last male member of his family, who left his estate at Bardon, Leicestershire to him on condition that he took the additional surname of Hood, the estate having been in the Hood family since the 1620s.  His father was Chief Engineer on the London, Brighton and South Coast Railway from 1846–1860.

Jacomb-Hood was educated at Tonbridge School and the Slade School of Fine Art as well as studying while touring abroad in Paris and Madrid. He was a member of the Royal Society of Painter-Etchers, the Savile Club, was Honorary Treasurer of the Chelsea Arts Club, member of the New English Art Club and the Royal Society of Portrait Painters. He exhibited at the first exhibition of the Society of Graphic Art in London in 1921.

Career
Jacomb-Hood regularly produced illustrations for The Graphic who gave him a number of overseas assignments. In 1896 the magazine sent him to Greece and to Delhi in 1902. He accompanied the Prince and Princess of Wales on their 1905 tour of India and was a member of George V's personal staff on his 1911 tour of India. He also painted Madeleine Shaw-Lefevre in her role as principal of Somerville College, Oxford.

He wrote an autobiography in 1925, entitled With Brush and Pencil.

Personal life
Jacomb-Hood married The Hon Henrietta Kemble de Hochepied-Larpent (1867–1941), daughter of Arthur de Hochepied Larpent, 8th Baron de Hochepied on 28 June 1910. On their marriage, John Singer Sargent, a friend and neighbour of Jacomb-Hood's in Chelsea, gave them his watercolour Italian Sailing Vessels at Anchor (c 1904–07) inscribed "to my friend Jacomb Hood" and now at the Ashmolean Museum in Oxford, presented in 1943 by her sister and heiress. 

Known as Reta, her sister The Hon Sybil Marguerite Gonne de Hochepied-Larpent, OBE (1867–1941) married Philip Napier Miles and Jacomb-Hood was a friend of his cousin Frank Miles. Another sister, The Hon Clarissa Catherine de Hochepied-Larpent, married the soldier and artist Colonel Robert Charles Goff. The Jacomb-Hoods lived in Chelsea after Frank Miles's death when Jacomb-Hood's father bought Miles's house in Tite Street from his executors and also had a house in Rye, East Sussex.

He died on 11 December 1929 at Philip Napier Miles's villa at Alassio in Italy.

References

External links

 
 

1857 births
1929 deaths
Alumni of the Slade School of Fine Art
19th-century British painters
British male painters
British etchers
British illustrators
People educated at Tonbridge School
People from Redhill, Surrey
19th-century British male artists
20th-century British painters
20th-century British male artists